Dzhoshkun Temenuzhkov Mihaylov (born 1 February 2000), known simply as Kun Temenuzhkov is a Bulgarian professional footballer who plays as a striker for CDA Navalcarnero  and Bulgaria U21's.

Club career

Youth career
Born in Haskovo, Temenuzhkov emigrated to Fraga, Spain, with his parents and four elder siblings at the age of a year and half. He started his youth career in local teams, before joining Barcelona in 2014 after being recommended by former Spain international Guillermo Amor.

In 2017, Temenuzhkov featured in The Guardians '60 of the best young talents in world football' list, with him likened to footballer Luis Suárez.

Leeds United
He joined English side Leeds United's academy in July 2017.

Temenuzhkov featured regularly for Carlos Corberán's Leeds United Under 23's side over the course of the 2018–19 season, showing his versatility by playing as a striker and in attacking midfield, that won the PDL Northern League 2018–19 Season by winning the league, they then became the national Professional Development League Champions by beating Birmingham City in the final.

He made his professional first team debut on 6 January 2019 during a 2–1 defeat to Queens Park Rangers in the third round of the FA Cup, as a 79th-minute substitute for Tom Pearce.

On 24 September 2019 Kun, together with four other Leeds U23s players, signed contract extensions.

Loan moves

On 30 January 2020 Kun joined La Nucía on loan until the end of the 2019–20 season. However the Spanish professional football season was paused in March 2020 due to the impact of COVID-19.

On 5 August 2020, after Leeds' promotion to the Premier League, Kun joined Spanish Segunda División B – Group 2 side Real Unión on loan until the end of the 2020–21 season. He ended the season with three goals in 19 league matches and on 21 May 2021 he confirmed he would return to Leeds and fight for his place in the team. In June 2021, he extended his loan at Real Unión for the duration of the 2021–22 season.

CDA Navalcarnero
In August 2022 Leeds United confirmed that Kun was released by mutual consent and he had joined Spanish fourth tier side CDA Navalcarnero.

International career

Background
Temenuzhkov is eligible to represent his country of birth, Bulgaria and Spain, the country he lived since a child.

Bulgaria youth team
Temenuzhkov has represented Bulgaria on all youth levels. In an interview for TF Methods on 16 May 2019 Kun announced that he had been called up to the Bulgaria U21 for the training camp in Kyiv and that his only desire is to play for Bulgaria on international level. He made his debut for the team on 3 June 2019 in a 1–1 draw against Israel U21.

Career statistics

Club

External links

References 

2000 births
Living people
People from Haskovo
Bulgarian footballers
Association football forwards
Leeds United F.C. players
Segunda División B players
CF La Nucía players
Real Unión footballers
Bulgarian expatriate footballers
Expatriate footballers in England
Expatriate footballers in Spain
Bulgarian expatriate sportspeople in England
Bulgarian expatriate sportspeople in Spain
Bulgaria youth international footballers
Primera Federación players
Sportspeople from Haskovo Province